Starchaser: The Legend of Orin is a 1985 animated space opera film directed and produced by Steven Hahn, and written by Jeffrey Scott. It was originally released in 3D by Atlantic Releasing. Starchaser: The Legend of Orin was one of the first animated movies to mix traditional and computer animation, as well as one of the first to be released in 3D.

Plot
In the future on a planet named Trinia, human slaves have lived underground for millennia mining crystals for a "god" named Zygon and his robot minions. One day Orin, a young miner, finds a jeweled sword embedded in the rocks. Hopps, grandfather of Orin's girlfriend Elan, recognizes the sword and gives his life to save Orin and keep the sword a secret. When Orin later takes the sword into his hands, it ascends into the air and buries itself in the cavern's floor. A projection of an old man appears from the blade, telling those present that above the caverns is a "magnificent universe" that the people may find. The blade then disappears, leaving only the hilt.

Forced to leave Orin's young, blind brother Calli behind, Orin and Elan set out to discover this universe and find the blade to the sword. Chased by Zygon's robots, they emerge in an industrial complex where they meet Zygon, who reveals the face of a human man beneath his mask. Zygon strangles Elan to death, but Orin escapes this fate when Zygon is distracted by the sword hilt. When Zygon's robots accidentally fire on a crystal deposit, Zygon presumes Orin dead in the resultant explosion and cave-in.

Orin digs a tunnel to the surface of Trinia, where he is later captured by Man-Droids, a group of decaying half-organic, half-robotic beings who intend to tear him apart and use his body parts to replace their own. Unexpectedly, his sword's hilt produces what is apparently an invisible blade, killing two of the Man-Droids and helping Orin escape. Orin subsequently runs into a human smuggler named Dagg Dibrimi, who takes Orin (whom he dubs "Water Snake" for his outrageous tale about human slaves in the mines) along on his journey to smuggle crystals. Eventually, Dagg seizes a load of crystals from a hovering freighter, but is driven away by Zygon and his robotic guards. During the fight, Dagg seizes a Fembot named Silica and uses it as a shield from laser blasts. Subsequently, re-programmed by Dagg, Silica becomes attached to him. At the same time a mysterious "Starfly" appears and attaches itself to Orin.

Dagg flies his spaceship, the Starchaser, to a city called Toga-Togo on the planet Bordogon, where he abandons Orin and gives Silica to a slave auctioneer. Orin wanders through the city, trying to find a clue that will lead him to the location of the hilt's blade. After meeting a fortune-teller who tells him to visit a place called Novaluna, Orin sees Silica offered for sale, whereupon he offers high prices to buy her. When the auctioneer finds that Orin has no knowledge of local currency, he takes Orin's freedom in addition to Silica's; but Dagg, moved by his own conscience, frees them. Later, Dagg and Orin visit the home of two desert-dwelling merchants, to whom Dagg sells the stolen crystals. Because Zygon has placed a price on Orin's head, the merchants offer to buy Orin as well, but Dagg refuses. In response, the merchants place a time bomb in Dagg's payment. Orin is forewarned by the Starfly, whereupon Dagg and Arthur, the Starchaser's artificial intelligence, throw the bomb into their enemies' camp. Thereafter Dagg agrees to take Orin to Novaluna, but they are shot down by Zygon's robotic soldiers. Dagg is captured and the ship is rendered inactive; Orin is thrown clear out of the ship but is rescued by Aviana, the daughter of Bordogon's Governor.

Upon waking up and meeting Aviana, Orin tells her his story, whereupon Aviana's computer reveals that the hilt has historically been used by a group of legendary guardians called the Kha-Khan to vanquish threats to humanity. Among these threats was a tyrant called Nexus, after whose defeat the hilt vanished until Orin's discovery of it. Aviana takes Orin to Trinia, where he again faces Zygon. Orin attempts to kill Zygon for Elan's death and thereby exposes him as a robot. Zygon then reveals that he is Nexus, seeking again to rule over humanity with his army of robots. Zygon takes Orin's hilt and begins to co-ordinate the attack, while Orin and Aviana are imprisoned in the cell block wherein Dagg is also captive. Just as Orin and Aviana confess their feelings toward one another, Aviana is taken aboard Zygon's flagship as a hostage. Orin is again approached by the Starfly, who brings him the hilt, which he uses to free himself and Dagg. They enter Zygon's flagship and take control of it, using it (again aided by the Starfly) to destroy the enemy fleet. They are rejoined by Silica, who has restored the Starchaser.

Orin and his friends penetrate Zygon's base, but are attacked by his remaining troops. While Dagg and Silica stay behind to fight off their pursuers, Orin enters his original cavern home and begins to denounce Zygon, but is interrupted by Zygon himself. They fight, resulting in Orin dangling over a chasm while Zygon gloats over him. As Orin hangs over the chasm, three Starflies appear and merge into one; but instead of giving him the hilt at his request, it states that he has no need of the hilt, adding that "there never was a blade". Orin therefore realizes that the power to create a cutting force came from himself. At this, he pulls himself up, generates such a force, and uses it to cut Zygon in half, sending him plummeting to his doom in the lava-filled chasm below. Orin's people subsequently rise in revolt and win their freedom.

Above, Silica mistakenly fires a laser blast from the Starchaser into the accumulated crystals, causing them to explode and triggering a chain reaction which threatens to collapse the mines. Orin uses the hilt to open a fissure by which his people ascend to Trinia's surface, where Orin uses his new-found power to heal Calli of his blindness and Dagg, Silica, and Aviana join them. Moments later, several Starflies reveal themselves to be the spirits of the previous Kha-Khan, including the elder man of the hilt's projection. They invite Orin to join them, but he refuses for the time being in favor of living with his friends and family. The other Kha-Khan respect Orin's choice and leave him as they fly into the starry beyond. The film's credits roll over a constellation of the blade-less sword's hilt.

Cast
 Joe Colligan as Orin
 Carmen Argenziano as Dagg Dibrimi
 Anthony De Longis as Lord Zygon 
 Noelle North as Elan and Aviana
 Tyke Caravelli as Silica
 Les Tremayne as Arthur, Man-Droid #1, and Smuggler #1
 Daryl Bartley as Kallie 
 Tina Romanus as Aunt Bella and Fortune Teller
 Thomas H. Watkins as Mizzo, Man-Droid #2, and Smuggler #2
 Mickey Morton as Mine-Master, Man-Droid #3, and Tactical Robots
 John Moschitta, Jr. as Z'Gork and Raymo
 Ken Sansom as Magreb and Major Tagani
 Mona Marshall as Star Fly
 Herb Vigran as Pops/Elan's grandfather

Incidental and background voices
 Cathy Cavadini
 Marilyn Schreffler
 Susan Silo
 Michael Winslow

Production
Steven Hahn a veteran animator in TV animation decided during the off-season to produce a feature film in order to give his South Korean animation studio something to work on.  Jeffrey Scott had served as a writer on several of Hahn’s TV projects so Hahn contacted him about collaborating on a film with Scott writing Escape to the Stars which would serve as the foundation for Starchaser. 

Production on Starchaser began in 1982 with the intention of being released in 1983, but issues involved the 3-D process resulted in the film being delayed by two years and ballooning in budget from the initially planned $2 million to $6 million. Director Steven Hahn said of the production:
Since there hasn’t been an animated film of this magnitude before we really had to work from scratch. The 3-D aspect doubled the amount of shooting required. There were often mistakes, some requiring retakes that normally wouldn’t have been necessary on a flat animated picture.

Starchaser: The Legend of Orin is identified as the world's first full-length animated project to be made in the 3D format, although a prior film, Abra Cadabra (1983), was also produced in 3D.

Release
The film was released in the United States by Atlantic Releasing on November 22, 1985. Spending at least 17 days in theaters, it made US$1,614,660 on its opening weekend and US$3,360,800 overall, making it #6 in the box office. The film did not fare well in South Korea, where animation production took place.

Starchaser: The Legend of Orin was released on VHS and Laserdisc on March 25, 1986 by Paramount Home Video, and also by KVC Home Video. The DVD was released on June 21, 2005 by MGM Home Entertainment.

Reception
The New York Times described the film as "such a brazen rip-off of George Lucas' Star Wars that you might think lawyers would have been called in".

Gene Siskel and Roger Ebert both gave the film a 'thumbs down', as they both found the movie uninspired and also felt the film was a rip-off of Star Wars.

Alex Stewart reviewed Starchaser: The Legend of Orin for White Dwarf #79, and stated that "if you're stuck with a houseful of brats on a rainy weekend, clamouring for some sanitised mayhem, then Starchaser'''s for you. It'll keep them quiet, and you'll probably find it amusing yourself".

Adaptations
In March 2012, Rilean Pictures acquired the rights to develop the 1985 3D animated film Starchaser: The Legend of Orin'' into a live-action motion picture, produced by Rilean Pictures’ partners Jonathan Saba and Juan Iglesias.

See also
 List of 3D films

References

External links
 
 Starchaser screenplay 
 Starchaser: The Legend of Orin on Rotten Tomatoes
 Starchaser: The Legend of Orin

1985 films
1985 animated films
1985 3D films
1980s American animated films
1980s fantasy adventure films
1980s science fiction films
American animated science fiction films
South Korean animated science fiction films
American animated fantasy films
South Korean animated fantasy films
American space adventure films
Atlantic Entertainment Group films
Films set on fictional planets
American fantasy adventure films
3D animated films
Animated films about robots
Animated films set in the future
1980s English-language films
Sword and planet films